Sean Paul Lawton (born 12 September 2003) is an English professional footballer who plays as a defender for Nantwich Town, on loan from Crewe Alexandra.

Lawton signed a scholarship deal with Crewe Alexandra's Academy in 2020.

He made his Crewe debut on 13 March 2022 in an EFL League One game against Sunderland at Stadium of Light as a late substitute for Zac Williams. He signed his first professional deal with the club at the end of the 2021–22 season.

In August 2022, Lawton went on loan to Crewe's Cheshire neighbours, Nantwich Town, making his debut for the Dabbers in a Northern Premier League Premier Division tie at Warrington Town on 29 August 2022. Due to injury, the initial one month's loan was extended by a further month in September, and later extended to the end of the season.

Career statistics

References

Living people
English footballers
English Football League players
Crewe Alexandra F.C. players
2003 births
Association football defenders
Nantwich Town F.C. players